In automotive electronics, body control module or 'body computer' is a generic term for an electronic control unit responsible for monitoring and controlling various electronic accessories in a vehicle's body.
Typically in a car the BCM controls the power windows, power mirrors, air conditioning, immobilizer system, central locking, etc.
The BCM communicates with other on-board computers via the car's vehicle bus, and its main application is controlling load drivers – actuating relays that in turn perform actions in the vehicle such as locking the doors, flashing the turn signals (in older cars), or dimming the interior lighting.

References 

Automotive Central Body Controller

Automotive electronics